Eric Owen Moss (born 1943 in Los Angeles) practices architecture with his eponymously named LA-based firm founded in 1973.

Education
Moss was born in Los Angeles, California, in 1943. He received a Bachelor of Arts from the University of California, Los Angeles in 1965, his Masters of Architecture from the University of California, Berkeley, College of Environmental Design in 1968 and a second Masters of Architecture from Harvard University Graduate School of Design in 1972.

Academics 
Moss has taught at Southern California Institute of Architecture (SCI-Arc) since 1974 and served as director from 2002 to 2015. He has held chairs at Yale and Harvard universities, and appointments at Columbia University, the University of Applied Arts Vienna, and the Royal Danish Academy of Fine Arts in Copenhagen.

Eric Owen Moss Architects 
Eric Owen Moss Architects, also known as EOMA, was founded in 1973.  The 25-person, Culver City-based firm designs and constructs projects in the United States and around the world.

The work of the office has been thoroughly documented in books, monographs, and publications internationally, including the 1,568 page Eric Owen Moss Construction Manual published by AADCU in 2009.

The most prominent work of the office is an on-going urban revitalization project in Culver City, California.  Since 1986 the EOMA team has been working with developers Frederick and Laurie Samitaur Smith to transform an abandoned industrial neighborhood into a campus for creative-minded companies.  Today the Hayden Tract and surrounding neighborhood attract some of the most successful design, film, internet, and digital media companies in the world.

Awards and honors
Moss received an Academy Award in Architecture from the American Academy of Arts and Letters in 1999. He was awarded the 2001 AIA/LA Gold Medal for his architectural work as well as the Business Week/Architectural Record Award in 2003 for the design and construction of the Stealth project, Culver City, California. He is a Fellow of the American Institute of Architects and received the Distinguished Alumni Award for the University of California at Berkeley in 2003. Moss received the 2007 Arnold Brunner Memorial Prize from the American Academy of Arts and Letters. In 2011, he was awarded the Jencks Award, given each year to an architect who has made a major contribution to theory and practice of architecture by the Royal Institute of British Architects. In 2014 Moss was named a "Game Changer" by Metropolis Magazine. In 2016, Moss was awarded the Austrian Decoration for Science and Art.

Major projects and competitions

 Triplex Apartments, Playa Del Rey, California, USA, 1976
Morganstern Warehouse, Los Angeles, California, USA, 1979
708 House, Los Angeles, California, USA, 1982
Petal House, Los Angeles, California, USA, 1984
8522 National Boulevard, Culver City, California, USA, 1986
UC Irvine Central Housing Office, Irvine, California, USA 1989
Lindblade Tower, Culver City, California, USA, 1989
Paramount Laundry, Culver City, California, USA, 1989
Gary Group, Culver City, California, USA, 1990
Lawson Westen House, Brentwood, California, USA, 1993
The Box, Culver City, California, USA, 1994
Gasometer D-1, Vienna, Austria, 1995 (unbuilt)
Samitaur, Los Angeles, California, USA, 1996
SPARCity, Culver City, California, USA, 1996
3535 Hayden Boulevard, Culver City, California, USA, 1997
Dancing Bleachers, Columbus, Ohio, USA, 1998
Umbrella, Culver City, California, USA, 1999
Stealth, Culver City, California, USA, 2001
Mariinsky Theater, St. Petersburg, Russia, 2001 (unbuilt)
Beehive, Culver City, California, USA, 2001
Queens Museum of Art, Queens, New York, USA, 2001 (unbuilt)
Caterpillar, Los Angeles, California, USA, 2001
Smithsonian Institution, Patent Office Building, Washington DC, USA, 2004 (unbuilt)
Guangdong Provincial Museum, Guangzhou, China, 2004 (unbuilt)
Republic Square, Almaty, Kazakhstan, 2006 (unbuilt)
3555 Hayden, Culver City, California, USA, 2008
If Not Now, When?, Vienna, Austria, 2009
Samitaur Tower, Culver City, California, USA, 2010
Cactus Tower, Culver City, California, USA, 2010
Austrian Pavilion, Venice, Italy, 2010
Nanjing Master Plan, Nanjing, China, 2013-current
Termicas del Besos, Barcelona, Spain, 2013-current
Pterodactyl, Culver City, California, USA, 2014
Sberbank Technopark, Moscow, Russia, 2016 (unbuilt)
Vespertine, Culver City, California, USA, 2017
(W)rapper, Los Angeles, California, USA, 2014-

Selected publications

There are twenty published monographs on the work of Moss' office.

The New City: I’ll See It When I Believe It, preface by Frank Gehry, essays by Jean-Louis Cohen, Jeffrey Kipnis, Thom Mayne, Wolf D. Prix, Michael Sorkin, Rizzoli, New York, 2016.
Todd Gannon (ed.), Eric Owen Moss Architects/3585: Source Books in Architecture 9, Applied Research + Design Publishing, San Francisco, 2016.
Eric Owen Moss, Coughing Up the Moon, SCI-Arc Press + AADCU, Los Angeles and Beijing, 2015.
Eric Owen Moss: I Maestri dell’Architettura, Hachette, France, 2012.
Eric Owen Moss, Again, Who Says?, SCI-Arc Press, Los Angeles, 2012.
Eric Owen Moss, Eric Owen Moss: Construction Manual 1988–2008, AADCU, Beijing, September 2009. 
Eric Owen Moss, Who Says What Architecture Is?, SCI-Arc Press, Los Angeles, November 2007.
Emilia Giorgi, Paradigmi Provvisori, Marsilio, Venice, 2007.
Paola Giaconia, Eric Owen Moss. The Uncertainty of Doing, Skira, Milan 2006.
Eric Owen Moss: Buildings and Projects 3, Rizzoli, New York 2002.
Eric Owen Moss, Gnostic Architecture, Monacelli, New York 1999.
Luca Rivalta, Eric Owen Moss, Edil Stampa, Italy, March 2002.
Preston Scott Cohen, Brooke Hodge (eds.), Eric Owen Moss. The Box, Princeton Architectural Press, New York 1996.
Eric Owen Moss. Buildings and Projects 2, Rizzoli, New York 1995.
James Steele, Lawson-Westen House (Architecture in Detail), Phaidon Press, London 1995.
Eric Owen Moss. Architectural Monographs, n. 29, Academy Editions, London 1993.
Eric Owen Moss. Buildings and Projects, Rizzoli, New York 1991.
Olivier Boissiere, Eric Owen Moss Architecte: Lindblade Tower & Paramount Laundry, Les Editions du Demi-cercle, Paris, Spring 1990.

References

External links
Eric Owen Moss Architects homepage

Architects from Los Angeles
1943 births
Living people
Southern California Institute of Architecture faculty
Academic staff of the Royal Danish Academy of Fine Arts
Educators from Greater Los Angeles
University of California, Los Angeles alumni
UC Berkeley College of Environmental Design alumni
Harvard Graduate School of Design alumni
20th-century American architects
21st-century American architects